Daniel Telser (born 24 January 1970) is a retired Liechtenstein football defender.

References

1970 births
Living people
Liechtenstein footballers
FC Balzers players
Association football defenders
Liechtenstein international footballers